La Fría is a town in Táchira, Venezuela.  It is the capital of García de Hevia Municipality.  It was founded in 1853.

Transport 
It is served by La Fría Airport.
It is proposed to have a railway station on the new national railway network.

See also 

 Railway stations in Venezuela

References 

Populated places in Táchira
Populated places established in 1853